Hellenic Bank Public Company Ltd (CSE: HB) is a bank in Cyprus.

History
The bank was founded in 1976 with technical assistance from Bank of America and in 1996 it bought the local operations of Barclays Bank. A major shareholder (29%) was traditionally and for many years, the Church of Cyprus. Between November 2013 and December 2014, the Church's shareholding shrank to 0.3% making it a small shareholder, after Cyprus based Demetra Investments Public Ltd holding 21%, Belarus owned video game company Wargaming Group Limited holding 20.2%, US investment manager PIMCO via Poppy Sarl, holding 17.3%, Greek bank Eurobank Ergasias holding 12.6%, the bank workers trade union ETYK provident fund and medical fund holding 6.26%, Canadian based Senvest International LLC/ Senvest Masterfund LP holding 5.1% and Cyprus based 7Q Financial Services Ltd holding 2.53%. The board is composed of representatives of the top four shareholders.

In January 2011, Hellenic Bank started operating in Russia but later, in 2014, sold the Russian operation The bank also has representative offices in Kyiv (Ukraine), St Petersburg and Moscow (Russia). It was also opening a representative office in Athens, Greece in 2017.

On 25 March 2013 Hellenic Bank sold its Greek branches to Piraeus Bank. As of 27 March 2013, former Hellenic Bank customers could use the ATMs of all Piraeus Bank Group banks (Piraeus Bank & ATEbank, Geniki Bank and former Bank of Cyprus and CPB Bank networks) free of charge. The process of merging the operations of the former Hellenic Bank network in Greece into Piraeus Bank was completed in mid-July 2013. This was followed by the closure of the vast majority of the former Hellenic Bank branches and the dismissal of its personnel.

In 2015 EBRD acquired a 5.4% share in Hellenic Bank.

In 2016, Hellenic Bank received a Global Finance Magazine award for the third consecutive year as the Best Digital Bank in Cyprus  and was upgraded to B rating by Fitch.

In July 2017, Hellenic Bank sold 51% of its Arrears Management Division (2.3bn Euro in Non Performing Exposures and 150mn Euro in property), including its Debt Recovery Unit and Property Management Unit to Czech specialised firm APS Holdings a.s and created a new company in which it is a minority 49% shareholder: APS Debt Servicing Cyprus Ltd. 129 Hellenic Bank employees will move to the new company.

In July 2018, Hellenic Bank purchased the performing loans and deposits of the Cyprus Cooperative Bank, including 75 branches and 1,100 staff, raising €150mn in new capital and making it the second largest Cypriot Bank with a 31% share of the Cypriot deposit market and 20% of the loans market. Youssef Nasr became Chairman of the board of Directors.

In August 2019, Evripides Polycarpou became Chairman of the board of Directors. In July 2021 German Oliver Gatzke became CEO.

On the 30th of November 2022, Wargaming Group Limited announced that it reached an agreement to sell a holding of 13.41% (55,337,721 Shares) of Hellenic Bank Public Company Ltd to Eurobank for a consideration of €70 million. If the agreement goes through by the supervisory authorities in Frankfurt, Eurobank will be the major shareholder of the bank with a 26.1% ownership.

References

External links

Hellenic Bank Group

Banks under direct supervision of the European Central Bank
1976 establishments in Cyprus
Companies based in Nicosia
Banks established in 1976
Banks of Cyprus
Companies listed on the Cyprus Stock Exchange